The 2000 Oceania Youth Athletics Championships were held at the Santos Stadium in Adelaide, Australia, between August 24–26, 2000. They were held together with the 2000 Oceania Open Championships.
A total of 33 events were contested, 17 by boys and 16 by girls.

Medal summary
Medal winners can be found on the Athletics Weekly website. Complete results can be found on the webpages of the World Junior Athletics History, and the Cool Running New Zealand newsgroup.

Boys under 18 (Youth)

Girls under 18 (Youth)

Medal table (unofficial)

Participation (unofficial)
An unofficial count yields the number of about 97 athletes from 18 countries:

 (4)
 (14)
 (8)
 (6)
 (1)
 (4)
 (3)
 (6)
 (8)
 (3)
 (11)
 (3)
 (1)
 (9)
 (6)
 (2)
/ (7)
 (1)

References

Oceania Youth Athletics Championships
International athletics competitions hosted by Australia
Oceanian U18 Championships
2000 in Australian sport
Youth sport in Australia
2000 in youth sport
August 2000 sports events in Australia